Klyashevo (Keläş) is a rural locality (a selo) in Ukteyevsky Selsoviet, Iglinsky District, Bashkortostan, Russia. The population was 168 as of 2010. There are 3 streets.

Geography 
Klyashevo is located 10 km north of Iglino (the district's administrative centre) by road. Starye Karashidy is the nearest rural locality.

References 

Rural localities in Iglinsky District